In organic chemistry, amine value is a measure of the nitrogen content of an organic molecule. Specifically, it is usually used to measure the amine content of amine functional compounds. It may be defined as the number of milligrams of potassium hydroxide (KOH) equivalent to one gram of epoxy hardener resin. The units are thus mg KOH/g.

List of ASTM methods 
There are a number of ASTM analytical test methods to determine amine value. A number of states in the United States have adopted their own test methods but they are based on ASTM methods. Although there are similarities with the method it is not the same as an acid value.
 ASTM D2073 - This is a potentiometric method.
 ASTM D2074-07
 ASTM D2896 - potentiometric method with perchloric acid.
 ASTM D6979-03

First principles 

The amine value is useful in  helping determine the correct stoichiometry of a two component amine cure epoxy resin system.

It is the number of Nitrogens x 56.1 (Mwt of KOH) x 1000 (convert to milligrams) divided by molecular mass of the amine functional compound. So using  Tetraethylenepentamine (TEPA) as an example:
Mwt = 189, number of nitrogen atoms = 5

So 5 x 1000 x 56.1/189 = 1484.    So the Amine Value of TEPA = 1484

Other amines 
All numbers are in units of mg KOH/g. 
 Ethylenediamine. Amine value = 1870 
 Diethylenetriamine. Amine value = 1634
 Triethylenetetramine. Amine value = 1537
 Aminoethylpiperazine. Amine value = 1305
 Isophorone diamine. Amine value = 660
 Hexamethylenediamine. Amine value = 967
 1,2-Diaminocyclohexane. Amine value = 984
 1,3-BAC. Amine value = 790
 2-Methylpentamethylenediamine -Dytek A. Amine value = 967
 m-Xylylenediamine -MXDA. Amine value = 825

See also-related test methods
 Acid value
 Bromine number
 Epoxy value
 Hydroxyl value
 Iodine value
 Peroxide value
 Saponification value

References

Further reading

External links 
 The chemistry of epoxide
 Synthesis of amines

Analytical chemistry